The Leader of the Opposition in South Africa is the leader of the largest political party in the National Assembly that is not in government. The House of Assembly was the most important House from 1910 to 1994 and the National Assembly from 1994. The leader of the opposition acts as the public face of the opposition, leading the Official Opposition Shadow Cabinet and the challenge to the government on the floor of Parliament. They thus act as a chief critic of the government and ultimately attempt to portray the opposition as a feasible alternate government.

The position of Leader of the Opposition in the National Assembly is currently held by John Steenhuisen of the Democratic Alliance, who was appointed on 27 October 2019.

In the list below, when the office is said to be vacant, there was no opposition party with more than ten seats and no clear Leader of the Opposition has been identified. This was the case between the formation of the Hertzog-Smuts coalition in 1933 and the breakaway of the Purified National Party in 1934. It was also the case during the government of National Unity from 1994 until the National Party ministers resigned in 1996.

In some cases, the Leader of the Opposition may have been the Parliamentary leader only, during a vacancy in the party leadership and the first part of their own tenure, before being confirmed as national party leader by a party congress. Athol Trollip and Lindiwe Mazibuko (and Mmusi Maimane for a short period) have been Parliamentary leaders only, whilst the incumbent national party leader of the Democratic Alliance, Helen Zille, was not a member of parliament.

Legal definition
Section 56 of the South Africa Act 1909, was amended by Section 1 (b) of the South Africa Act Amendment Act 1946. A salary was provided for the Leader of the Opposition and the office was given an official definition.

The current Constitution of South Africa makes provision for recognition of the Leader of the Opposition in section 57(2):

Rule 21 of the rules of the National Assembly provides in similar words that:

List of leaders of the opposition in South Africa (1910–present)

 
Notes

References
 The South African Constitution, by H.J. May (3rd edition 1955, Juta & Co)
 Keesing's Contemporary Archives, various volumes
 Smuts: A Reappraisal, by Bernard Friedman (George, Allen & Unwin 1975) 
 South Africa 1982 Official Yearbook of the Republic of South Africa, published by Chris van Rensburg Publications

Parliament of South Africa
Leader of the Opposition
South Africa